Milton Whitehead may refer to:

Milt Whitehead (1862–1901), Major League Baseball player for the St. Louis Maroons and Kansas City Cowboys in 1884
Milton "Bus" Whitehead (1928–2010), American college and Amateur Athletic Union standout basketball player in the 1950s